This article is a list of presidents of Webster University (previously Loretto College in the 1920s and Webster College until the 1980s).

References 

Webster University
Webster